Magdaléna Zappe (1757 – after 1819) was an Austrian Empire stage actress and dancer. She is known as a member of the founding pioneer generation of the first Czech-language theater in Prague, the Vlastenské Theatre.

She was married to the Czech actor Antonín Zappe. She was engaged at the Ballet Court Theatre i Wien (1774–76) in the theater company of K. Wahr, which regularly performed in Salzburg, in Pressburg and in Pest (1776–79), and from 1779 in Prague; firstly in the ballet of the Estates Theatre (1779–86) and then at the newly founded pioneer Vlastenské Theatre, where she belonged to the first actors employed. As was not uncommon at the time, she was both a dancer as well as an actor. She played heroines, soubrette and mother-parts. While being of Austrian origin and somewhat criticized for her Austrian dialect, she performed both in Czech as well as in German.

References 

 Starší divadlo v českých zemích do konce 18. století. Osobnosti a díla, ed. A. Jakubcová, Praha: Divadelní ústav – Academia 2007
 http://encyklopedie.idu.cz/index.php/Zappe,_Magdal%C3%A9na

18th-century Bohemian actresses
18th-century Bohemian ballet dancers
1757 births
19th-century deaths
Actresses from the Austrian Empire
Ballerinas from the Austrian Empire